History of Christchurch may refer to: 

History of Christchurch, New Zealand, history of the city in New Zealand
History of Christchurch, Dorset, history of the town in Dorset, UK